"Hurricane" is a song by American recording artist Bridgit Mendler, from her debut studio album, Hello My Name Is... (2012). The song was released as a promotional single to the iTunes Store as Single of the Week on October 22, 2012, and was later announced to be the second single from the album. On February 12, 2013, the song was released to Top 40 radio.

The song was praised by music critics but it missed the Billboard Hot 100 by one position, debuting and peaking at number one on the US Billboard Bubbling Under chart.

Composition

"Hurricane" exhibits elements of rap, gospel and pop. Built on a beat and multi-tracked harmonies, the song's instrumentation includes slow-bouncing keyboard tones, and drums. The song was written by Mendler and American songwriters Emanuel Kiriakou, Evan Kidd Bogart, and Andrew Goldstein, and produced by Kiriakou and Goldstein. Lyrically, the song gives ode to a disaster love, as well as reconciliation and perseverance in love. Mendler's vocals span from the low note of F3 to the high note of F5. In interview for Coup de Main Magazine, Mendler commented about recording a rap song for the first time. She said:

Critical reception
The song was praised by the media. Tim Sendra of AllMusic said, "[Hurricane] has clever fairy tale lyrics and an impassioned vocal (and a sassy rap section)." Girls' Life magazine stated "[Mendler] brings the beat in 'Hurricane', where she belts out some sweet raps about being in the middle of a stormy relationship." Kai of Embrace You magazine claimed that the track title was "quite ironic when we’re currently experiencing one of mother nature’s conception of the said thing" and later said that "interestingly enough, I love this song. The acoustic opener caught me instantly and I’m addicted to her 'oh, oh, oh…' The singer’s play on natural disasters as metaphors for the way she feels about her love interest once again showcases how witty she is as an artist. The fast paced pop rock driven track is both catchy and substantial."

Music video
The music video for "Hurricane" was directed by Robert Hales and filmed in London in March 2013. It was released on April 12, 2013. Naomi Scott appears as Mendler's best friend in the video. They previously worked together in the 2011 Disney Channel film Lemonade Mouth.

Live performances

The song was performed in all dates of her tour, Bridgit Mendler: Live in Concert. On October 20, 2012, Mendler performed the song on Radio Disney and Disney Channel webshow Total Access. The first television performance was on March 11, 2013, on Live! with Kelly and Michael. On April 27, 2013, Mendler performed "Hurricane" at the 2013 Radio Disney Music Awards, making it her first performance at an award show. On June 5, 2013, she performed the song on Ellen. Mendler performed "Hurricane" on Today and on Nova FM on August 30, 2013. During an exclusive interview with the Grammy Awards website, she performed "Hurricane" along with "Ready or Not".

The Hurricane Sessions
In April 2013, Mendler recorded a series of four videos which were released to Vevo and YouTube entitled The Hurricane Sessions, and are acoustic performances of two songs from Hello My Name Is... and two covers. On May 8, 2013, the first video, "Starry Eyed", an Ellie Goulding cover, was released. It received positive reviews. Sam Lansky of Idolator commented, "[Mendler's] husky voice works nicely with the song, especially toward the end, as it gets a little more emotive." On May 15, 2013, she released the second song, "Locked Out of Heaven", a Bruno Mars cover. Fanlala said that they "might like Bridgit's version just as much as the original." "Hurricane", the third video, was released on May 22, 2013. Two months later, the final video, "Top of the World", was released on July 23, 2013.

Set list
 "Starry Eyed"  – 3:03
 "Locked Out of Heaven"  – 3:38
 "Hurricane" – 4:04
 "Top of the World" – 3:01

Track listing

Digital download
"Hurricane" – 4:03

Digital download
"Hurricane" – 4:04
"Hurricane" (Acoustic Hurricane Sessions) – 3:57

US Promo CD single
"Hurricane" (radio edit) – 3:43
"Hurricane" (radio edit) – 3:43
"Hurricane" (radio edit) – 3:43

UK Promo CD single
"Hurricane" (radio edit) – 3:43
"Hurricane" (instrumental) – 3:57

Remixes EP
"Hurricane" (Bit Error Vocal remix) – 5:30
"Hurricane" (Belanger remix) – 4:21
"Hurricane" (Frank Lamboy remix) – 5:04
"Hurricane" (Alex Ghenea remix) – 4:00
"Hurricane" (C&M remix) – 4:13

Promo remixes CD
"Hurricane" (Bit Error remix) – 5:30
"Hurricane" (Belanger remix) – 4:21
"Hurricane" (Frank Lamboy remix) – 5:04
"Hurricane" (Alex Ghenea remix) – 4:00
"Hurricane" (C&M remix) – 4:14
"Hurricane" (Bit Error dub mix) – 6:19
"Hurricane" (Bit Error radio mix)" – 3:49
"Hurricane" (Bit Error vocal mix - Acapella) – 5:25
"Hurricane" (Bit Error vocal mix - Instrumental) – 5:31
"Hurricane" (Frank Lamboy instrumental)" – 5:04
"Hurricane" (Frank Lamboy radio remix)" – 3:23

Credits and personnel
Credits for the album version of "Hurricane" are obtained from Hello My Name Is... liner notes.
Bridgit Mendler – Vocals, songwriter, background vocals
Emanuel Kiriakou – Songwriter, producer, keyboards, guitars, bass, programming, background vocals, ukulele
Evan Kidd Bogart – Songwriter, background vocals
Andrew Goldstein – Songwriter, producer, keyboards, guitars, bass, programming, background vocals
Serban Ghenea – Mixing
Jens Koerkemeier – Engineer, editing

Charts

Certifications

Release history

References

2013 singles
Bridgit Mendler songs
Songs written by Emanuel Kiriakou
Songs written by E. Kidd Bogart
Hollywood Records singles
2011 songs
Song recordings produced by Emanuel Kiriakou
Songs written by Bridgit Mendler
Songs written by Andrew Goldstein (musician)
Music videos directed by Robert Hales